The Inde is a small river in Belgium and in North Rhine-Westphalia, Germany

Geography

The Inde is a left (western) tributary of the Rur/Roer, in eastern Belgium and in North Rhine-Westphalia, western Germany.

Its source is near Raeren, in Eastern Belgium. The Inde runs through Aachen-Kornelimünster, Eschweiler, and Inden. Its mouth is on the Rur near Jülich. Because of lignite opencast mining, a section of the course was diverted near Inden-Lamersdorf in 2003 .

Tributaries of the Inde include the streams: Omerbach, Otterbach, Saubach, Vichtbach, and Wehebach.

History
Its name is of Celtic origin: Inda.
The suffix -ella is an example for Celtic river names comparing for instance Mosella (= Moselle, i.e. "small Mosa (= Maas)"). For the name "Inde", the Indoeuropean stem *wed (= water) is supposed, like in words like Italian "onda" and French "onde" (= wave). 

The Inde acquired historical importance when Emperor Louis the Pious founded the Kornelimünster Abbey monastery along one of its old courses in 815.

See also
List of rivers of North Rhine-Westphalia

References

International rivers of Europe
Rivers of the Ardennes (Belgium)
Rivers of North Rhine-Westphalia
Rivers of Belgium
Rivers of Liège Province
Raeren
Rivers of the Eifel
Rivers of Germany